Simon Wincer (born 1943) is an Australian director and producer of film and television. He attended Cranbrook School, Sydney, from 1950 to 1961.  On leaving school he worked as a stagehand at TV Station Channel 7. By the 1980s he had directed over 200 hours of television.  In 1986, he directed the telemovie The Last Frontier and also won a Christopher Award. He also directed the 1993 family film Free Willy.

Filmography

Film

Television
TV series

TV movies
 The Haunting of Hewie Dowker (1976)
 The Last Frontier (1986)
 Bluegrass (1988)
 Flash (1997)
 Escape: Human Cargo (1998)
 The Echo of Thunder (1998)
 Murder She Purred: A Mrs. Murphy Mystery (1998)
 P.T. Barnum (1999)
 Crossfire Trail (2001)
 Monte Walsh (2003)

Miniseries
 Against the Wind (1978) (co-directed with George T. Miller)
 Lonesome Dove (1989)
 Into the West (2005)
 Comanche Moon (2008)

Awards and nominations

References

External links

1943 births
Living people
Australian film directors
Australian film producers
Australian film studio executives
Australian television directors
English-language film directors
People from Sydney
Primetime Emmy Award winners
People educated at Cranbrook School, Sydney
Western (genre) film directors